Willie Sherrod Smith Jr. (born November 30, 1931) is a former American football and basketball coach. He served as the head football coach at Norfolk State College—now known as Norfolk State University—in 1967, the University of Maryland Eastern Shore from 1971 to 1972, and North Carolina Central University from 1973 until midway through the 1977 season, compiling a career college football coaching record of 35–35–5. Smith was also the head basketball coach at Hampton University for one season, in 1961–62, tallying a mark of 7–16.

Head coaching record

Football

Notes

References

1931 births
Living people
Hampton Pirates football coaches
Hampton Pirates men's basketball coaches
Maryland Eastern Shore Hawks football coaches
Norfolk State Spartans football coaches
Norfolk State Spartans men's basketball coaches
North Carolina Central Eagles football coaches
College track and field coaches in the United States
University of Illinois alumni
West Virginia State University alumni
Coaches of American football from Virginia
Basketball coaches from Virginia
African-American coaches of American football
African-American basketball coaches
20th-century African-American sportspeople
21st-century African-American sportspeople